The Men's Sailboard (Mistral One Design) Competition at the 1996 Summer Olympics was held from 22 July to 2 August 1996 in Savannah, Georgia, United States. Points were awarded for placement in each race. Eleven races were scheduled. Nine races were sailed. Each sailor had two discards.

Results

Daily standings

Conditions at the Mistral course areas

Notes

References 
 
 
 

 
 

Mistral One Design Men's
Mistral One Design competitions
Men's events at the 1996 Summer Olympics